Geohintonia mexicana (discovered in 1992) is a species of cacti, the only species in the genus Geohintonia. This genus is named after its discoverer George S. Hinton. As its specific epithet suggests, the plant is found in Mexico (Nuevo León), where it grows on gypsum hills near Galeana.

Description
It is a solitary, globose plant, slowly becoming columnar, up to 10 cm tall and 10 cm in diameter. grayish bluish green. It has between 18 to 20 very prominent ribs, with 3 curved spines about 3 to 12 mm long on each areola. The hot pink, funnel-shaped flowers emerge at the apex and open after dark.

The species has one form: Geohintonia mexicana f. cristata.

References

External links

Cacti of Mexico
Endemic flora of Mexico
Flora of Nuevo León
Monotypic Cactaceae genera
Near threatened biota of Mexico
Cactoideae